The Beautiful Cheat is a 1926 American silent comedy film directed by Edward Sloman and starring Laura La Plante, Alexander Carr, and Harry Myers.

Plot
As described in a film magazine review, motion picture studio magnate has press agent Jimmy Austin take pretty shop clerk Mary Callahan abroad where she is transformed using publicity methods into the Russian actress Maritza Callahansky, who is advertised as having the crown jewels. Returning to the United States, the publicity game continues. Maritza throws a party at a Long Island mansion while the rightful owner is absent. However, the owner's unexpected sudden return causes momentary confusion, but the situation is straightened out by the son of the family, who has joined the film acting brigade. Jimmy and Mary decide to marry.

Cast

Preservation
A print of The Beautiful Cheat is held at the UCLA Film and Television Archive.

References

Bibliography
 Munden, Kenneth White. The American Film Institute Catalog of Motion Pictures Produced in the United States, Part 1. University of California Press, 1997.

External links

1926 films
1926 comedy films
Silent American comedy films
American silent feature films
1920s English-language films
Universal Pictures films
Films directed by Edward Sloman
American black-and-white films
1920s American films